Neal 'n' Nikki is a 2005 Indian romantic comedy film starring Uday Chopra and Tanishaa Mukerji in lead roles, with Richa Pallod and Gaurav Gera in supporting roles, and Abhishek Bachchan in a special appearance. It was produced by Yash Chopra under his banner Yash Raj Films and directed by Canada-based director Arjun Sablok. 

Neal 'n' Nikki's teaser trailer was released along with Salaam Namaste which released on 9 September 2005. The film released on 9 December 2005 to highly negative reviews from critics and emerged as a commercial failure at the domestic box office; however it did well in overseas markets.

Plot
The film, as its name implies, centers on Gurneal "Neal" Ahluwalia  and Nikita "Nikki" Bakshi, two Canadians of Punjabi descent, born and raised in British Columbia. But Neal and Nikki are different in many ways.

Before getting married Neal wants to spend 21 days on vacation with 21 women. On his way, he meets Nikki in a club, where Neal is with his date Kristi. Nikki gets drunk and starts dancing. Neal leaves his date and takes Nikki to a hotel where he watches T.V. while Nikki falls asleep. The next morning, Nikki thinks that Neal raped her when he didn't. She uses this to blackmail him all the time. Nikki interrupts his romantic meetings with other women from time to time, including once when Nikki interrupts Neal while he is having sex with another woman.

When Neal tells Nikki the truth why he is in Canada, she gets mad and dumps him. Nikki then takes Neal to Whistler, a resort town, promising that she will make him meet other girls there. In reality, her ex-boyfriend Trish is there with his girlfriend Amanda, and she wants to make him jealous. When Neal learns this, he doesn't agree but eventually does. They are successful in making Trish jealous. He tells Nikki that he wants her back, but she dumps him. They later spend a night together at a campsite but are unable to express their love to each other.

Neal then returns since it is time for his wedding. Later he finds out that the girl to whom he is to be engaged, Sweety, is Nikki's cousin. At the engagement ceremony just when Nikki is approaching to stop the engagement, it is revealed that Nikki's cousin had exchanged vows on the internet with her true love Happy Singh. Sweety proceeds to run away with Happy, while Neal proposes to Nikki because they realise that they are meant for each other.

Cast  
Uday Chopra as  Gurneal 'Neal' Ahluwalia
Tanishaa Mukerji as Nikita 'Nikki' Bakshi
Richa Pallod as Satwinder 'Sweety' Kaur
Gaurav Gera as Happy Singh
Abhishek Bachchan as Raj Singh (Special appearance)
 Michelle Rae Wright as Vancouver police officer
Kamini Khanna as Baldev
Susheel Parashara as Gyaniji
Sanaa Abdu Khazal as Katrina
Kristy McQuade as Kristy
Samantha McLeod as Chanel
Alexandre Montez as Trish
Serinda Swan as Amanda
Simmy Cheema as Nikki's mother
Pawan Chopra as Nikki's father
Kanika Dang as Sweety's mother
Sahar Biniaz as Teacher

Soundtrack
The music was composed by Salim–Sulaiman. It consisted of 5 songs and 1 remix. Lyrics were penned by Anvita Dutt Guptan, Irshad Kamil and Asif Ali Beg.

Track listing

Critical response
Taran Adarsh of IndiaFM gave the film 1 star out of 5, writing "On the whole, Neal 'n' Nikki concentrates more on sex, skin show, sleaze and vulgarity than a sound story. A terrible letdown in terms of content, the film has precious little to offer to the moviegoers. At the box-office, the generous dose of skin show and vulgarity in the absence of a script will tell on its business. Also, may a scene in English will only restrict its appeal further." Derek Elley of Variety wrote "Fluff is hardly the word for "Neal 'n' Nikki", a mismatched romantic comedy that makes most Bollywood twosomes look like art movies. The latest production from usually reliable Yash Raj Films aims to push the envelope but delivers little more than candy-floss entertainment." Raja Sen of Rediff.com gave the film a negative review, writing "This year, with films like No Entry and Garam Masala, we've already seen that heroines can be relegated to zero importance in the success of a film. If Neal 'n' Nikki is a hit, it'll just mean we can crank out mindless films where the leading actors aren't important at all. Which is a terrifying thought."

Jaspreet Pandohar of BBC.com gave the film 3 stars out of 5, writing "Neal 'N' Nikki may follow the same path as most love stories (boy meets girl, boy can't stand girl, boy falls for girl after a few misunderstandings along the way), but it does so in a refreshingly daring manner. At times verging on the vulgar, writer/director Arjun Sablok makes full use of Mukerji's cleavage and Chopra's six-pack in comic scenes. But the couple's screen chemistry gradually overshadows the repetitive bikini and boxers shots, bringing to life a pair of thoroughly likeable characters who drag Bollywood's prudish attitudes kicking and screaming into the 21st century."

References

External links

Neal 'n' Nikki official site

2005 films
Films set in British Columbia
2000s Hindi-language films
Indian sex comedy films
2000s sex comedy films
2005 romantic comedy films
Indian romantic comedy films
Yash Raj Films films
2005 soundtrack albums
Films scored by Salim–Sulaiman